Fabrice Colin (born 6 July 1972, in Paris) is a French author of fantasy, science fiction, and magic realism. His 2003 novel Dreamericana won the Grand Prix de l'Imaginaire.
Colin and his family lived in Boumerdès, Algeria from 1976 to 1978.

External links 
Interview (In French)
Official website

1972 births
French science fiction writers
Living people
French male novelists